Meelis Rooba (born 20 April 1977) is an Estonian professional football coach and former player. He also played for the Estonian national team.

International career
Rooba made his debut for Estonia national football team on 7 July 1996, against Latvia. He made a total of appearances for his country.

Personal life
Rooba is the older brother of former professional footballer Urmas Rooba who made 70 appearances for the Estonia national team between 1996 and 2008.

References

External links

1977 births
Living people
Sportspeople from Paide
Estonian footballers
Estonia international footballers
FC Flora players
Viljandi JK Tulevik players
Paide Linnameeskond players
Estonian football managers
Association football midfielders
JK Tervis Pärnu players